United States gubernatorial elections were held on November 8, 1994, in 36 states and two territories. Many seats held by Democratic governors switched to the Republicans during the time known as the Republican Revolution. Indeed, this would be the first election since 1969 that Republicans won the majority of governorships.

Before the elections, 21 seats were held by Democrats, 14 held by Republicans, and one by an independent. After the elections, 11 seats would be held by Democrats, 24 by Republicans, and one by an independent.

The elections coincided with the midterm elections for the Senate and for the House of Representatives. As of to date, it was the last time that Democrats have won gubernatorial elections in Florida and Nebraska.

Election results

States

Territories and federal district

Closest races 
States where the margin of victory was under 1%:
 Alaska, 0.2%
 Maryland, 0.4%
 Alabama, 0.9%

States where the margin of victory was under 5%:
 Florida, 1.5%
 Maine, 1.5%
 Georgia, 2.1%
 South Carolina, 2.5%
 New York, 3.3%
 Connecticut, 3.5%
 Rhode Island, 3.8%

States where the margin of victory was under 10%:
 Pennsylvania, 5.5%
 Hawaii, 5.9%
 Texas, 7.6%
 Arizona, 8.2%
 Idaho, 8.4%
 Oregon, 8.5%
 Tennessee, 9.6%
 Guam, 9.7%
 New Mexico, 9.9%

See also
1994 United States elections
1994 United States Senate elections
1994 United States House of Representatives elections

Notes

References